St Mary Our Lady is the parish church of Sidlesham in West Sussex, England. The church is down a short lane off the Chichester to Selsey road, by some thatched cottages. The current church originates from around 1200, probably on the site of an earlier Saxon church.

History
The manor of Sidlesham was conferred by the Saxon monarch Cædwalla on Saint Wilfred, as a portion of his gift to the see of Selsey. Wilfrid had arrived in the then, kingdom of the South Saxons in 681 and remained there for five years evangelising and baptising the people. The manor continued to be held by the Bishops of Selsey until the see was transferred to Chichester in 1075. At the time of the Domesday Book (1086), it was held by the Bishop of Chichester in demesne and assessed at 12 hides. The gift was confirmed by William the Conqueror and the manor remained in church hands until the reign of Elizabeth I. The rectory of Sidlesham was a prebend of Chichester Cathedral and in 1291 it was valued at £30.

It is believed that the current church that was begun in the late 12th century or early 13th century replaced an earlier Saxon church.

Buildings

The style of the building is early English. As built, the church was cruciform, with a chancel tower, transepts and aisles. It is built of stone rubble with ashlar dressings, the porch is of brick and the roofs are tiled. Originally the Chancel extended beyond the bounds of the existing east wall. There were two Chantry chapels and, possibly, two aisles built in the 14th century. There was also a vestry to the north of the Chapel area.
The north chapel and part of the Chancel were allowed to fall into ruin, probably in the early 16th century, but were rebuilt, using much of the original materials, shortly after 1660. During this rebuilding, the east window was moved to the current position, giving the church the unusual T-shape it has now.

The Chancel area is traditionally, the responsibility of the Vicar, the remainder of the building being 
that of the Church Wardens. It seems possible that, at some time, there was a disagreement about this since, to make it absolutely clear two small stones inscribed, "Chancel Boundary, 1814" were inserted in the eastern columns. The niches (or piscinas), adjacent to the Altar, are original and were used for the cleansing of the Holy vessels, after celebration of the Holy Communion. An aumbry has been built into the wall, adjacent to the Altar, to keep the Blessed sacrament.

During the Middle Ages, the nave must have been very dark, as the only light came from the three narrow windows in both the north and south walls and two in the west wall. In 1596, three of these windows were converted to oblong windows.

The font, adjacent to this window, is about the same age as the church and is typical of early Sussex work. It was removed from the church, during the Civil War and its weather-beaten and rather battered appearance may be the result of it having been buried during this time. It was re-erected in 1660. There is a drain, from the font, which discharges just above the tiled floor. An Edict requires that the water in the font, which has been blessed, should be collected and cast away outside the church. In the old days, it was suspected that if this action was not taken, the water might be used for witchcraft purposes.

In the 18th century, side galleries and large box pews were constructed the incisions to support the galleries can be seen, cut into pillars. It seems likely that, to compensate for the reduction of light, led to the villagers subscribing to the splendid brass candelabrum, installed in 1750.

There is an iron screen, dating from 1815, in the north chapel, that is a fine example of the work of Sussex blacksmiths.

The brick north porch and segment-headed doorway are late 18th century.

On 3 September 2017, the Bishop of Chichester opened the Parish rooms, a building adjacent to the church. The purpose of the rooms, according to the St Mary's website, is to provide 21st-century facilities to the church. The rooms provide:
Lavatories
A small catering facility and running water
Sunday School facilities and small hall
Parish office
Storage.

Music
In the 15th century, the tower was added, complete with a minstrel's gallery; at the same time bells were hung, music for the services would have been provided by a village orchestra, comprising flute, fife, bassoon and fiddle. In 1850, a harmonium replaced the orchestra to provide music in the church.

The current organ, in the organ loft at the west end of the church, came from the Chapel of St Luke in the Radcliffe Infirmary, Oxford and is a 2 manual instrument by G M Holdich. In its former location in Oxford the organ was regularly played by the pianist and composer Jack Gibbons who as a child held the position of organist at the Radcliffe Infirmary's St Luke's Chapel.

The church has both a junior and adult choir for the services.
St Mary's has a particularly fine acoustic and is the home of a long-established concert series "Music in Church", as well as being the venue for other performances.

Bells
The tower originally held three bells, however there are now only two. The third one was recorded as "missing" in 1724.

The remaining two consist of a tenor bell, that was cast around 1390, possibly by William Beresford in East Sussex and the Sidlesham bell that was cast in 1611 by Thomas Giles.

War memorial
The Sidlesham War Memorial is a grade II listed structure. It is located within the churchyard and consists of a squat obelisk on a square plinth. It is set within a small kerbed enclosure. It was originally constructed in the 1920s to commemorate the 20 Sidlesham people who lost their lives in the First World War.

There was an addition dedicated in 1948 to the people who lost their lives in the Second World War. Coincidentally and unusually it was for 20 people as in the First World War.

The graveyard has a total of eight graves commemorated by the Commonwealth War Graves Commission. There are three war graves dating from the First World War and five from the Second World War.

See also
 Grade I listed buildings in West Sussex
 List of bishops of Chichester and precursor offices
 List of current places of worship in Chichester (district)

Notes

References

External links
 Video history of Saint Mary's Church, Sidlesham
 

Church of England church buildings in West Sussex
Chichester District
Grade I listed churches in West Sussex